Carl Manner (18 July 1929 – 19 April 2017) was Chairman of the Supervisory Board of Josef Manner & Comp. AG, a Viennese confectionery factory.

References

1929 births
2017 deaths
Businesspeople from Vienna